Clementoni SpA is an Italian company which deals with the production of educational toys, based in Recanati.

History 
The company was founded in 1963 by Mario Clementoni (Potenza Picena, 1925 - Recanati, 2012) who, after an experience in the world of musical instruments in Pesaro, decided to start producing a product that was still little known in Italy at the time: the board game. He started the business with his wife Matilde and a few people who worked by hand, in an artisanal way. The first game is the Tombola of the song linked to the most famous songs of the period, so Portobello, Befana, Mago Silvan.

In 1967, he obtained an important commercial success with the presentation on the market of the boxed game Sapientino.

In 2017 the company developed the Sapientino Doc robot as part of the project A scuola di coding con Sapientino which it promoted in Italian schools.

Archive 
The Clementoni archive  is kept in Recanati, at the company's headquarters, in the collection of the same name (chronological data: 1963 - 2011), and is divided according to company activity: research and development, marketing, administration, personnel. The documentation relating to the "molds" (molding on plastic material carried out at the Contrada Santa Croce plant) and to the advertising production is filed in electronic format and accompanied by photographs.

References 

Game manufacturers
Italian companies established in 1963
Toy companies of Italy